Kaalam Maari Pochu is a 1996 Indian Tamil-language comedy film directed by V. Sekhar. The film stars Pandiarajan, Sangita, Vadivelu, Kovai Sarala, R. Sundarrajan and Rekha. It was released on 13 April 1996 and was a blockbuster hit, running for 175 days. The film was remade in Malayalam as Arjunan Pillayum Anchu Makkalum, in Kannada as Ellara Mane Dosenu and in Telugu as Family.

Plot

Sadagopan and Meenakshi have four daughters and a son. Sadagopan always thinks that the son is an asset to him and his real heir, while daughters are a burden on his head. Sadagopan searches grooms for his educated three elder daughters with the help of his Iyer priest friend. He is upset that he cannot find grooms for his daughters unless he is ready to offer them at least forty sovereigns of gold each. Sadagoppan wants to marry his daughters to grooms who do not require any dowry. He somehow finds out three under qualified grooms meeting his dowry conditions such as Murugesan a marriage catering cook for elder daughter Lakshmi, Sekar a Corporation pesticide-spraying worker for second daughter Sundari and an auto-rickshaw driver Muthupandi for his third daughter Indira. He forces his decision on his daughters to marry only them caring neither about whether they are right match for their daughters either in terms of qualification or job nor his daughters' refusal to marry them. His third daughter Indra strongly resists his decision of the wedding proposals of her sisters along with Meenakshi. Indira insists that she has to meet her groom personally to find whether he is a proper match for her, and only she will accept him. Sadagopan actually lies to Indra that her groom is actually a businessman running an automobile shop so that she will marry him, which as otherwise a storm will erupt if she knows her groom's real job. The first two daughters marry their groom reluctantly, but Indra is however satisfied with her would be husband. However, Indra is infuriated when she learns the truth about Muthupandi. All the three women move into their husbands' houses. Although no dowry was paid, the three wayward husbands want to rely on their wives' property and asks for some money to start their own businesses, to which the wives agree.

Sadagopan's son is very selfish, and he does not want to share his father's property among his sisters. Sadagopan also supports him out of blind love for the male child. The three women suffer mentally amidst son only loving father, selfish brother and greedy husbands who care least about any of the feelings of the daughter or sister or wife. Sadagopan's son gets married to a powerful politician's daughter. At the wedding, the husbands Muthupandi, Sekar and Murugesan feel insulted and quarrel. They were insulted and told to leave the wedding hall, which further angers them. They vent out their frustration and anger on their respective wives and compel them to bring money from their parents' home. This brings up quarrels between the three couples. Meenakshi promises them that she will talk to her husband and arrange the money. An unexpected twist comes when her son cunningly tries to inherit all the properties in his name, taking advantage of his father's blind love, which shocks Meenakshi. She vigorously fights for her daughters' rights, which falls in to deaf ears. Her extreme emotion leads her to brain damage, causing her to die, leaving her daughter's devastated. Sadagopan is very much upset that his son is so much loyal to his in-laws and never cares about his house and also refuses to accommodate his pregnant elder sister in their house as her labor date nears. Sadagopan slowly realizes his son's true colors and the mistake he did with the marriage decision of his three daughters. He decides to marry off his last daughter to someone well qualified and well doing, unlike he did for other daughters, so that at least she gets a happy life. This infuriates his son when he learns that Sadagopan is going to spend the money for his last daughter from the property, which he thinks that belongs only to him. This creates a fight between father and son, and Sadagopan and his sister are thrown out of the house by him.

Indra, Lakshmi and Sundari file a petition in court for a rightful share of their father's property, which angers their brother further. However, on advice of his father-in-law, he pretends to come to a smooth agreement with them that he will spend the money for their sister's wedding in exchange for the signature of withdrawing the case and forgoing their rightful share of their father's property. Indra is alerted by his cunningness, and she stops everyone from accepting it. The three husbands change their minds and realized their mistake of being greedy. They support their wives to conduct the wedding at any cost.

On the day of the wedding, the brother creates all the possible ruckus he could and wants to stop the wedding at any cost unless the sisters sign the agreement. He even goes to the extent of kicking his pregnant sister and frantically attacks all the other sisters, including the bride. Sadagopan is enraged by this and he in turn beats his son frantically to kill him. The sisters stop him and shout that he is the reason for their brother to behave like this. The daughters shout at him for being so biased against them right from their childhood and for him, son is superior and daughters are inferior. He is one who has spoiled his son and raised him without any respect and love for his sisters. Sadagopan and his son realize their mistakes for being so biased and greedy respectively. They both have now understood that daughters are not inferior to sons and have all the rights even after getting married. All the men finally reunite with the sisters and conduct the wedding of the fourth daughter happily.

Cast

Pandiarajan as Muthupandi
Sangita as Indra
Vadivelu as Sekar
Kovai Sarala as Sundari
R. Sundarrajan as Murugesan
Rekha as Lakshmi
Raj Chander
Vinu Chakravarthy as Sadagopan
Vennira Aadai Moorthy as Iyer
Vadivukkarasi as Meenakshi
Oru Viral Krishna Rao as Muthupandi's father
Shanmugasundari as Rangamma, Sekar's mother
Kalidoss as Politician
Idichapuli Selvaraj as a marriage broker
Bonda Mani as Sekar's coworker
Jayamani
LIC Narasimhan as Advocate
Kovai Senthil
Bayilvan Ranganathan as a garment factory owner
MLA Thangaraj as Police officer
Vijay Ganesh

Awards
The film has won the following award since its release:

Tamil Nadu State Film Awards 1996

Best Comedian - Vadivelu

Soundtrack

The film score and the soundtrack were composed by Deva. The soundtrack, released in 1996, features 5 tracks with lyrics written by Vaali and Vairamuthu.

Remakes

References

1996 films
Tamil films remade in other languages
1990s Tamil-language films
Films scored by Deva (composer)
Films directed by V. Sekhar